The Pakistan cricket team toured Australia from October to December 2019 to play two Tests and three Twenty20 International (T20I) matches. The Test series formed part of the inaugural 2019–2021 ICC World Test Championship. The second Test was a day/night match at the Adelaide Oval. Cricket Australia confirmed the fixtures for the tour in May 2019.

Ahead of the tour, Sarfaraz Ahmed was sacked as captain of Pakistan's team, following Pakistan's poor run of form. Azhar Ali and Babar Azam were named as the captains of the Test and T20I squads respectively.

Australia won the T20 series 2–0, after the first match finished as a no result. Australia also won the Test series 2–0, winning both matches by an innings margin.

Squads

Ahead of the T20I series, Glenn Maxwell took an indefinite break from cricket to deal with a mental health issue, that ruled him out of the T20I series with D'Arcy Short was named as his replacement. Sean Abbott was added to Australia's squad for the third T20I match. Australia's James Pattinson was suspended from the first Test of the series. He was found guilty of using abusive language during Victoria's loss against Queensland in the fourth round of the 2019–20 Sheffield Shield.

Tour matches

20 over match: Cricket Australia XI vs Pakistan

Three-day match: Australia A vs Pakistan

Two-day match: Cricket Australia XI vs Pakistan

T20I series

1st T20I

2nd T20I

3rd T20I

Test series

1st Test

2nd Test

Notes

References

External links
 Series home at ESPN Cricinfo

2019 in Australian cricket
2019 in Pakistani cricket
2019–20 Australian cricket season
International cricket competitions in 2019–20
Pakistani cricket tours of Australia